The New Zealand rockfish, Acanthoclinus littoreus, is a roundhead of the genus Acanthoclinus, found only in New Zealand from shallow depths to 15 m.  Their length is between 5 and 15 cm.

References
 
 
Tony Ayling & Geoffrey Cox, Collins Guide to the Sea Fishes of New Zealand,  (William Collins Publishers Ltd, Auckland, New Zealand 1982) 

New Zealand rockfish
Endemic marine fish of New Zealand
Fish described in 1801